is a Japanese wrestler. He competed in the men's Greco-Roman 62 kg at the 1976 Summer Olympics.

References

1951 births
Living people
Japanese male sport wrestlers
Olympic wrestlers of Japan
Wrestlers at the 1976 Summer Olympics
Place of birth missing (living people)
Asian Games silver medalists for Japan
Asian Games medalists in wrestling
Wrestlers at the 1974 Asian Games
Medalists at the 1974 Asian Games
20th-century Japanese people